West Donegal or Donegal West may refer to:
The Western part of County Donegal, in Ireland
Two parliamentary constituencies
 West Donegal (UK Parliament constituency), 1885–1922
 Donegal West (Dáil constituency), 1937–1961

In the United States
West Donegal Township, Lancaster County, Pennsylvania